Chorzów is a city in the Silesia region of southern Poland, near Katowice. Chorzów is one of the central cities of the Upper Silesian Metropolitan Union – a metropolis with a population of 2 million. It is located in the Silesian Highlands, on the Rawa River (a tributary of the Vistula).

Administratively, Chorzów is in the Silesian Voivodeship since 1999, previously Katowice Voivodeship, and before then, the Silesian Voivodeship. Chorzów is one of the cities of the 2.7 million conurbation – the Katowice urban area and within a greater Silesian metropolitan area with the population of about 5,294,000 people. The population within the city limits is 105,628 as of December 2021.

History

City name
The city of Chorzów was formed in 1934–1939 by a merger of 4 adjacent cities: Chorzów, Królewska Huta, Nowe Hajduki and Hajduki Wielkie. The name of the oldest settlement Chorzów was applied to the amalgamated city.

The etymology of the name is not known. Chorzów is believed to be first mentioned as Zversov or Zuersov in a document of 1136 by Pope Innocent II as a village with peasants, silver miners, and two inns. Another place-name likely indicating Chorzów is Coccham or Coccha, which is mentioned in a document of 1198 by the Patriarch of Jerusalem, who awarded this place to the Equestrian Order of the Holy Sepulchre of Jerusalem. Chorzów is then mentioned as Chareu or Charev in 1257 and then Charzow in 1292. The last name may originate from the personal name Charz, short for Zachary and may mean Zachary's place. The a in the early names may have been later modified to the current pronunciation with o perhaps due to similarity to the common adjective chory=ill and a presence of a hospital (which was moved in 1299 to Rozbark at the gates of Bytom). Today, the place of the old village is a subdivision called Chorzów III or Chorzów Stary = the Old Chorzów.

The industrial and residential settlement south-west of Chorzów constructed since 1797 around the Royal Coal Mine and Royal Iron Works was named Królewska Huta by the Poles or Königshütte by the Germans, both names meaning Royal Iron Works. As it was growing quickly this settlement was granted city status in 1868. Today this neighbourhood is called Chorzów I or Chorzów-Miasto meaning Chorzów Centre.

The etymology of Hajduki is ambiguous and is interpreted as either related to the German word for moorland (German: die Heide), or adopted from the German/Polish/Silesian term for hajduk(s) (Polish (plural): Hajduki; German (singular): Heiduck), which locally meant bandits. The place was first mentioned in 1627 as Hejduk and shown on 18th century maps as "Ober Heiduk" and "Nieder Heiduk" (i.e., Upper and Lower Heiduk). The later names Hajduki Wielkie and Nowe Hajduki mean Great Hajduks and New Hajduks, respectively. The two settlements were merged in 1903 and named after the Bismarck Iron Works Bismarckhütte. When the international borders shifted, the name of Bismarck was replaced with the name of the Polish king Batory (so-chosen to preserve that initial "B", which appeared on an economically important local trademark). Today this city subdivision is called Chorzów IV or Chorzów-Batory.

From 12th century to World War I

Village of Chorzów
In the 12th century, the castellany of Bytom, including the Chorzów area, belonged to the Seniorate Province (Kraków Duchy) of Poland. In 1179 it was awarded by Duke Casimir the Just to the Duke of Opole, and since that time the history of Chorzów has been connected to the history of Upper Silesia (Duchy of Opole).

The oldest part of the city, the village of Chorzów, today called Chorzów Stary, belonged since 1257 to the Equestrian Order of the Holy Sepulchre of Jerusalem. Already at that time silver and lead ores were mined nearby, later also the ores of iron. There is more documentation for 16th century developments.

From 1327, the Upper Silesian duchies were ruled by the dukes of the Piast dynasty and were subject to Bohemian overlordship.  The Crown of Bohemia elected Polish-Lithuanian Jagiellons kings from 1471 and Austrian Habsburgs kings after 1526. In 1742, the area was conquered by the Prussian Hohenzollerns in Silesian Wars, setting the stage for the Prussian industrial might. The Prussian and then German period lasted for about 180 years and overlapped with the time of rapid industrialization.

Royal iron works, coal mines and chemistry

With the discovery of bituminous coal deposits at the end of the 18th century by the Polish local priest Ludwik Bojarski, new industrial sectors developed in the Chorzów area. In the years 1791–1797 the Prussian state-owned Royal Coal Mine was constructed (Kopalnia Król, Königsgrube, later renamed several times with the changing political winds). In 1799, first pig iron was made in the Royal Iron Works (Królewska Huta, Königshütte). At the time, it was a pioneering industrial establishment of its kind in continental Europe. In 1819 the ironworks consisted of 4 blast furnaces, producing 1,400 tons of pig-iron. In the 1800s the modern Lidognia Zinc Works was added in the area. In 1871 the ironworks were taken over by the holding called Vereingte Königs- und Laurahütte AG für Bergbau und Hüttenbetrieb, which added a steel mill, rail mill and workshops. In the vicinity of the Royal Coal Mine, Countess Laura Coal Mine was opened in 1870, and by 1913–1914 coal production increased to 1 million tons a year. In 1898, a thermal power plant was commissioned which was, until the 1930s, the biggest electricity producer in Poland with a power of 100 MW (electrical). Today, it operates as "ELCHO". In 1915, nitrogen chemical works (Oberschlesische Stickstoffwerke) were built nearby to produce fertilizers and explosives by newly invented processes: from the air, water and coal (see Haber-Bosch process). Today, it operates as "Zakłady Azotowe SA".

Królewska Huta: from village to city

Settlements grew near the new coal and ironworks. Since 1797, one group of settlements was called Königshütte (Królewska Huta in Polish) after the ironworks. In 1846 Królewska Huta received a railway track to Świętochłowice and Mysłowice, in 1857 to Bytom and until 1872 to all major cities in the Silesian region. Królewska Huta received city status in 1868 as part of Bytom County, and in 1898 it was made a separate city-county.

The population of Królewska Huta was increasing rapidly: from 19,500 inhabitants in 1870 to 72,600 in 1910. Among them 17,300 workers were employed in the industry (similar number for 1939). The population spoke mostly Polish or German.

Hajduki Wielkie suburb
In the village of Hajduki Wielkie, just south of Chorzów and Królewska Huta, Bismarck Iron Works (Bismarckhütte) was opened in 1872, later called Bathory Iron Works (Huta Batory). A large carbochemical plant was started in 1889, the first such chemical plant in what was to later become the Polish state. Today the company operates as "Zakłady Koksochemiczne Hajduki SA".

Polish community
Towards the end of 19th century, Chorzów experienced a revival of Polish national feelings. Ethnic tensions were mixed with the religious and class conflicts. Karol Miarka was the editor of Polish books and newspapers including Katolik (The Catholic) published in Królewska Huta since 1868, Poradnik Gospodarski (Economic Advisor) since 1879. He was also the founder of several organizations: Upper Silesian Union, Upper Silesian Peasants Union. Juliusz Ligoń was a Polish activist and poet. In 1920 the football club Ruch Chorzów was founded in the city. Later on, it would become one of the most successful Polish football teams.

Interwar Poland (1922–1939)

In the Upper Silesia plebiscite a majority of 31,864 voters voted to remain in Germany while 10,764 votes were given for Poland Following three Silesian Uprisings, the eastern part of Silesia, including Chorzów and Królewska Huta, was separated from Germany and awarded to Poland in 1922. Migrations of people followed. Because of its strategic value, the case of the nitrogen factory Oberschlesische Stickstoffwerke was argued for years before the Permanent Court of International Justice, finally setting some new legal precedences on what is "just" in international relations. In 1934, the industrial communities of Chorzów, Królewska Huta and Nowe Hajduki were merged into one municipality with 81,000 inhabitants. The name of the oldest settlement Chorzów was given to the whole city. In April 1939, the settlement of Hajduki Wielkie with 30,000 inhabitants was added to Chorzów.

In part due to the German-Polish trade war in the 1920s, the industry of Chorzów, a border city at that time, stagnated until 1933. In 1927, a division of Huta Piłsudski was separated into a company making rail cars, trams and bridges; today it operates as Alstom-Konstal. The State Factory of Nitrogen Compounds (Państwowa Fabryka Związków Azotowych) was in 1933 merged with a similar company (largely its copy) in Tarnów-Mościce.

German occupation during World War II (1939–1945)

On the day of the outbreak of World War II in September 1939, Chorzów was taken by Nazi Germany. Polish irregulars, mainly Silesian uprising veterans and scouts, put up resistance to the regular German forces for three days, afterwards the city was occupied by Germany, and on September 6, 1939, the Einsatzgruppe I entered the city to commit various atrocities against Poles. Most of the Polish defenders were murdered in mass executions. An execution of three Poles was carried out by the German Freikorps already on September 3, 1939. A unit of the Einsatzgruppe I was stationed in Chorzów, and it was responsible for many crimes against Poles committed in Chorzów and the nearby cities of Czeladź and Siemianowice Śląskie. Polish property was confiscated, and Chorzów was promptly re-incorporated into German Silesia; the Upper Silesian industry being one of the pillars of the Nazi Germany war effort. In 1939 and 1940, the Germans carried out mass arrests of Polish intelligentsia, especially teachers, for which a prison was operated in the city (see  Intelligenzaktion). Local Polish teachers were among Poles murdered in 1939 in Chorzów and Strzybnica (present-day district of Tarnowskie Góry), and later in the Dachau concentration camp.

There were several forced labour camps in Chorzów, including one Polenlager solely for Poles, two camps solely for Jews, the E246, E594 and E725 subcamps of the Stalag VIII-B/344 prisoner-of-war camp, and, in years 1944–1945, a subcamp of the Auschwitz concentration camp, in which approximately 200 Jews from German-occupied France, Belgium and Czechoslovakia were imprisoned. In January 1945, the prisoners of the subcamp of Auschwitz were evacuated on foot to Gliwice, and then deported to the Nordhausen-Dora concentration camp. Chorzów was occupied by the Soviet Red Army in January 1945 with the subsequent persecution of many ethnic Polish Silesians and Germans.

After 1945

At the end of World War II, Chorzów was given to Poland. Generally, the Chorzów industry suffered little damage during World War II due to its inaccessibility to Allied bombing, a Soviet Army enveloping manoeuvre in January 1945, and perhaps Albert Speer's slowness or refusal to implement the scorched earth policy. This intact industry now played a critical role in the post-war reconstruction and industrialization of Poland. After the war, businesses were nationalized and operated, with minor changes, until 1989. Some were used as Soviet labour and concentration camps. Some industrial hardware and at least 100,000 Polish Silesians were deported to the Ukrainian Donbass region. At the "fall of communism" in 1989, the area was in decline. Since 1989, the region has been transitioning from heavy industry to a more diverse economy.

On 28 January 2006, a roof collapsed at an exhibition hall, killing 65 people. See Trade hall roof collapse in Katowice, Poland.

In 2007, Chorzów became a part of the Upper Silesian Metropolitan Union, a voluntary union of a continuous chain of cities aimed at increasing the poor visibility of the area, improving its competitiveness, and modernizing the infrastructure.

The region experienced several waves of migrations, including those commencing in 1945 (to Germany and from Poland and Ukraine), in 1971–1976 (to Germany), in 1982 (to Western countries), and from 2003 (to other countries of the EU).

Geography

Location
Chorzów is in the middle of the largest urban center in Poland. The recently (2007) formed Upper Silesian Metropolitan Union is the largest legally recognized urban entity in Poland with a population of 2 million.

Nine million people live within  of Stadion Śląski in Chorzów. Six European capitals are located within : Berlin, Vienna, Prague, Bratislava, Budapest and Warsaw.

Climate
Weak West winds (less than 2 m/s) prevail.

Demographics
Detailed data as of 31 December 2021:

Economy

Chorzów used to be one of the most important cities in the largest Polish economic area (the Upper Silesian Industry Area) with extensive industry in coal mining, steel, chemistry, manufacturing, and energy sectors. Many heavy-industry establishments were closed or scaled down in the last two decades because of environmental issues in the center of a highly urbanized area, and also because of decades-long lack of investment. Others were restructured and modernized. Wedged between a dozen of other cities, the population has been decreasing. The city character has been evolving towards the service economy as new industrial development takes mostly place at the border of the Upper Silesian Metropolitan Union. The Unemployment rate is high (12.6% on 2007-12-31) but decreasing; the workforce is generally highly technically skilled.

Major industrial establishments are:
Huta Batory – steel
Huta Kościuszko SA – steel
Chorzów Power Station
Zakłady Chemiczne Hajduki SA – carbochemistry
Zakłady Azotowe SA – nitrogen fixation and methanol
Alstom-Konstal – transport manufacturing and construction
KWK Polska Wirek, rejon Prezydent – coal mine
ProLogis – logistics
Messer – technical gases

Transport

Car:
Freeway A4: from German Autobahn A4 at Görlitz/Zgorzelec to Wrocław-Gliwice-Chorzów (Batory)-Katowice-Kraków (and towards Ukraine)
Express Route (DTŚ): Katowice-Chorzów-Ruda Śląska-Zabrze
National Route DK79: Katowice-Chorzów-Bytom

Three railway stations on two major routes:
Katowice-Chorzów Batory-Gliwice
Katowice-Chorzów Batory-Chorzów Miasto-Chorzów Stary-Bytom

Air:
Katowice International Airport

Public transport:
Chorzów is well connected within the Upper Silesian Metropolitan Union with Bus lines and tram lines. Silesian Interurbans is one of the largest streetcar systems in the world, in existence since 1894.

Higher education
Within the city limits of Chorzów:
 University of Silesia (Uniwersystet Śląski), two faculties
 WSB Universities – WSB University in Chorzów (Wyższa Szkoła Bankowa)
 Górnośląska Wyższa Szkoła Pedagogiczna (Upper-Silesian Teachers College)
 Górnośląska Wyższa Szkoła Przedsiębiorczości im. Karola Goduli (Karl Godulla Upper-Silesian Higher Business School)
 Śląska Wyższa Szkoła Informatyki (Silesian Higher School of Information Technology)
 Numerous general and technical high schools

The nearby cities of Katowice and Gliwice are far larger academic centers than Chorzów.

Silesian Central Park and nature

The nationally known Silesian Central Park covers about 30% of the city area and features:
Silesian Zoological Garden
Stadion Śląski, the largest sports stadium in Poland
Planetarium and Astronomical Observatory
A large rose-exhibition garden (7 hectares, 385 varieties of roses)
Legendia Theme Park
Upper Silesian Ethnographic Park
International Exhibition Grounds
A swimming-pool complex
A water sports center
A tennis court complex
Green areas

Chorzów also features other notable nature areas, including:
 nature-landscape protected area "Żabie Doły"  (at the border with Bytom and Piekary Śląskie),
 nature-landscape protected area of "Uroczysko Buczyna" (at the border with Katowice and Ruda Śląska),
 aquatic complex "Amelung".

Sports

Clubs:
Ruch Chorzów – a men's football team (14 time national champion, 3-time winner of the Polish Cup), and female handball team (9 time national champion).
Alba Echo Chorzów – men's Basketball team (2nd division)
SCS Sokół Chorzów – women's volleyball team (B division, 6th place in 2003/2004)
Clearex Chorzów – 5-player football team (Polish Cup winner, 1st division, 2nd in 2003/2004)

Historically notable is the former club AKS Chorzów.

Stadion Śląski is a former home stadium for the Poland national football team, and used for international football games and other events (for example, it has held the Speedway World Championships four times, with the 1973 World Final attracting over 120,000 spectators, the world record attendance for Motorcycle speedway). The stadium also hosts large music concerts. Throughout its history it featured such artists and groups as The Rolling Stones, Metallica, Guns N' Roses, AC/DC, U2, Iron Maiden, Linkin Park, Pearl Jam, Red Hot Chili Peppers, Genesis and The Police.

Notable people

Born in Chorzów

Kurt Alder (1902–1958), German chemist, Nobel Prize in chemistry
Reinhard Appel (1927–2011), German journalist and television presenter
Gerard Cieślik (1927–2013), Polish footballer
Marcin Dylla (born 1976), Polish classical guitarist
Jakub Dziółka (born 1980), Polish former footballer
August Froehlich (1891–1942), German Roman Catholic priest, member of the resistance against Nazism and martyr
Karolina Gluck, Polish victim of the 7/7 Bombing in London on 7 July 2005 (killed on the Number 30 bus at Tavistock Square)
George Golla (born 1935), Australian jazz musician
Monika Hojnisz (born 1991), biathlete
Szymon Kapias (born 1984), Polish footballer
Theodor Kotulla (1928–2001), German film director
Agnieszka Krukówna (born 1971), actress
Marek Kubisz (born 1974), Polish footballer
Olgierd Łukaszewicz (born 1946), Polish actor
Janusz Michallik (born 1966), former American national team soccer player, currently a commentator for ESPN
Walter Mixa (born 1941), Bishop of Augsburg and military Bishop of the Bundeswehr
Helga Molander (1896–1986), German actress, and mother of Hans Eysenck
Paul Mross or Paweł Mróz (1910–1991), Polish and German chess player
Leonard Piątek (1913–1967), Polish soccer star of the interbellum period
Antoni Piechniczek (born 1942), Polish soccer coach (lead twice the national team at World Cup)
Ladislaus Pilars de Pilar (1874–1952), Polish poet and entrepreneur
Ryszard Riedel (1956–1994), blues rock vocalist
Günther Rittau (1893–1971), German cameraman and film director
Oskar Seidlin (1911–1984), American scholar
Tino Schwierzina (1927–2003), last mayor of East Berlin
Hanna Schygulla (born 1943), German actress and chanson singer
Stephan Stompor (1931–1995), musicologist
Adam Taubitz (born 1967), German jazz and classic musician
Franz Waxman (1906–1967), American composer
Friedrich Weißler (1891–1937), lawyer
Gerard Wodarz (1913–1982), Polish soccer star of the interbellum period

Associated with Chorzów
Friedrich Wilhelm von Reden (1752–1815), German pioneer in mining
John Baildon (1772–1846), Scottish pioneer in metallurgy
Adolph Menzel (1815–1905), German artist
Anton Froehlich (1860–1931), Upper Silesian wholesale merchant, mill owner 'First Königshütte Steam Mill', chairman of the supervisory board of Śląski Bank Ludowy Królewsk Huta, G.-Śl
Ignacy Mościcki (1867–1946), Polish chemist and then President of Poland
Fritz Haber (1868–1934), German chemist
Eugeniusz Kwiatkowski (1888–1974), eminent Polish economist and politician
Joe Wickham (1890–1968), Irish sportsperson
Ernest Wilimowski (1916–1997), Silesian soccer star
Jerzy Buzek (born 1940), Prime minister of Poland, former President of the European Parliament

Twin towns – sister cities

Chorzów is twinned with:

 Creil, France
 Iserlohn, Germany
 Ózd, Hungary
 Termoli, Italy
 Ternopil, Ukraine
 Zlín, Czech Republic

References

Further reading
J. Janas, Historia Kopalni Król w Chorzowie 1871–1945, Katowice 1962
A. Stasiak,  Miasto Królewska Huta. Zarys rozwoju społeczno-gospodarczego i przestrzennego w latach 1869–1914, Warszawa 1962
J. Surowiński, 75 lat Zakładów Koksochemicznych Hajduki 1888–1963, Warszawa 1963
L. Pakuła, Chorzów, [in:] Encyklopedia Historii Gospodarczej Polski do 1945, Warszawa 1981
Chorzów, [in:] J.Bochiński, J.Zawadzki, Polska. Nowy podział terytorialny, przewodnik encyklopedyczny, Warszawa 1999

External links

Gallery of historical and contemporary photos
Chorzow-Silesia web forum
Jewish Community in Chorzów on Virtual Shtetl
Chorzów City Forum "ChorzowART"
Chorzów City official site

 
Cities in Silesia
City counties of Poland
Cities and towns in Silesian Voivodeship
Silesian Voivodeship (1920–1939)
Cities with powiat rights
Nazi war crimes in Poland